Comedy Central is a Belgian television channel based on the American channel of the same name. 
Comedy Central has been several years in Europe with broadcasters in the Netherlands, Germany, Sweden, Poland, Italy, United Kingdom and Hungary. The channel broadcasts mainly of comedy, in the form of animation, series, movies and stand-up shows. In Belgium, the channel started on Monday, January 20, 2014, with the broadcast of a program block on the TMF channel, every day from 22 hours to 24 hours. The channel is available on cable, digital terrestrial and IPTV operators in Flanders. It aired between 10 pm and midnight on the channel of music channel TMF. As of November 1, 2015, it broadcasts 24 hours a day.

Comedy Central is owned by Paramount International Media Networks Benelux. The ad sales are handled by DPG Media.

Productions

Dutch
POPOZ
10 jaar voor New Kids: De Pulpshow

American
Inside Amy Schumer
South Park
Comedy Central Roast
The Daily Show
Tosh.0
Workaholics
30 Rock
3rd Rock from the Sun
8 Simple Rules
Aliens
American Dad!
Archer
Becker
Better off Ted
Bless the Harts
Bob's Burgers
Bored to Death
Californication
Call Me Fitz
Chuck
Community
Dickie Roberts: Forever Child Star
Eastbound & Down
Entourage
Family Guy
Friends
Frasier
Futurama
Grounded for Life
How I Met Your Mother
Hi Hi Puffy AmiYumi
Hung
It's Always Sunny In Philadelphia
Kevin of the North
Malcolm in the Middle
My Name Is Earl
Psych
Punch-Drunk Love
Rick and Morty
Scrubs
Stand Up Saturday
That '70s Show
The Best of Saturday Night Live
The Cleveland Show
The Jeff Dunham Show
Married... with Children
The Middle
The Office US
The Roast Of...
The Simpsons
Tosh.0
Yes Dear
Young & Hungry

From the United Kingdom:
Free Agents
Takeshi's Castle (British edited version and Dutch commentary)
Taking the Flak
The Graham Norton Show'''The IT CrowdTwo Pints of Lager and a Packet of Crisps''

References

External links 
 Comedy Central Belgium

Comedy Central
Television channels and stations established in 2014
Television channels in Flanders
Television channels in Belgium